Codmore Hill is a hamlet in the Horsham District of West Sussex, England. It lies on the A29 road 1 mile (1.6 km) north of Pulborough. It is in the civil parish of Sutton.

External links

Horsham District
Villages in West Sussex